Shek Wing-cheung (1 January 1913 – 3 June 2009), better known by his stage name Shih Kien, Sek Kin, or Sek Gin or Shek Kin(), was a Hong Kong–based Chinese actor. Shih is best known for playing antagonists and villains in several early Hong Kong wuxia and martial arts films that dated back to the black-and-white period, and is most familiar to Western audiences for his portrayal of the primary villain, Han, in the 1973 martial arts film Enter the Dragon, which starred Bruce Lee.

Biography

Early life
Shih was raised by his stepmother and was a sickly child. He decided to practise martial arts to improve his health and trained for nine years. Shih trained at Shanghai's Chin Woo Athletic Association and was among the first generation of students at the school to be certified as instructors. After becoming certified to teach styles, including Eagle Claw and Choy Li Fut, he decided to start his career as an actor. However, the outbreak of the Second Sino-Japanese War caused his studies to be disrupted. Shih and his friends travelled between Guangzhou and Hong Kong to stage drama performances, in order to raise funds as part of the anti-Japanese movement. Besides acting on stage, Shih also participated in back-stage activities, such as makeup and arrangements of lighting and props.

Career
In 1940, Shih officially entered the entertainment industry as an apprentice of the Cantonese opera makeup artist Sit Kok-Sin, before becoming an actor. Shih starred as a Japanese secret agent in his debut film Flower in the Sea of Blood that year. 

Nine years later, Shih was invited by film director Wu Pang to work with him on a series of Wong Fei-hung-related films. Shih gained fame for his portrayal of the villains in those films, and continued to play the role of the antagonist in several films during the first 20 years of his career. Shih's iconic "villain laughter" in the films was later mimicked and parodied by several actors.

In 1973, Shih was chosen to portray the villain in Bruce Lee's martial arts movie Enter the Dragon, in which he played Han, a one-handed triad boss who is highly skilled in martial arts (his character's voice was provided by Keye Luke). His character had a final showdown with Lee's character in the ending climax of the film.

In 1975, Shih joined the Hong Kong television station TVB, and appeared in several wuxia-themed television series, playing villains most of the time. However, he had also played the roles of gentlemanly, kind and fatherly characters, such as: Cheung Mo-kei's godfather Tse Shun in The Heaven Sword and Dragon Saber (1978), Lung Koon-sam in The Good, the Bad and the Ugly (1979), So Tai-pang in The Brothers (1980), and a grandfather in The Feud of Two Brothers (1986). Shih also shone in dramatic roles in non-wuxia films as well, such as Hong Kong 1941. Later in his career, Shih took on a comedic role with Jackie Chan in The Young Master.

In 1980, Shih was invited to participate in filming a television commercial to promote Ricola's mint candy products with his popular image as a villain.

Retirement and death
Shih retired from the entertainment industry in 1992, with the 1994 film HK Adam's Family (奸人世家) specially dedicated to him. He appeared in the 2003 documentary Chop Socky: Cinema Hong Kong at the age of 90.

Shih received the Life Achievement Award in 1996 at the Golden Bauhinia Awards. Seven years later in 2003, Shih received the Professional Achievement Award at the 22nd Hong Kong Film Awards with Cho Tat-wah, who portrayed the protagonist or hero in several of the films they starred together in. In 2006, Shih donated one of his properties to the entertainment industry in support of the development of the industry. Between January and February 2007, the Hong Kong Film Archive showed 13 of Shih's films that were preserved at the archive.

Shih died of kidney failure on 3 June 2009 at the age of 96. At the time of his death, Shih was believed to be one of the oldest living successful actors in Hong Kong.

Personal life
Shih married Lee Kit-ying in 1936 and they had four sons and two daughters. Shih was initially not religious, but he converted to Christianity.

Lee Kit-ying died of heart failure in August 1998.

Popular culture
In Hong Kong, the term "Kan Yan Kin" was a popular reference to Shih. This nickname was borrowed as the Chinese title for the 2007 TVB comedy drama Men Don't Cry.

Filmography

Films
This is a partial list of films.

Xuehai Hua (1940) – Japanese Spy
Dijiu Tianchang (1940)
Gui lai yan (1948)
Na Zha mei shan shou qi guai (1949) – White Gorilla
The True Story of Wong Fei Hung (1949, part 1, 2) – Gray Hair Fu
Hong Hei Koon huit chin Lau ga chun (1949) – Lau Sum-yim
Zhujiang lei (1950) – Cheung Kau
Hao men qi fu (1950)
Huo shao Shao Lin si (1950)
Fang Shi Yu xue zhan Yin Yang Dong (1950) – Priest Pak Mui
Dadao Wang Wu Xuezhan Xiao Bawang (1950)
Lu A Cai (1950)
Lei dian zhui feng jian (1951)
Huang Fei Hong chuan da jie ju (1951)
Dadao Wang Wu Yuxue Jinchou Ji (1951)
Yi fan feng shun (1951) – Lo Kin-ping
Hu dan ying hun (1952) – Chiu Fu
Jia (1953) – Ko Hak-ming
Feng liu tian zi (1953)
Ye du Yuan Yang jiang (1953)
She qing gui (1953)
Huang Fei Hong yi gun fu san ba (1953) – Wong Kwong-Jun
Chun (1953) – Ko Hak-ming
Qiu (1954) – Ko Hak-ming
Bin cheng yan (1954)
Huang Fei Hong yu Lin Shi Rong (1954) – Lui Kung-Cheung
Cheng da sao (1954)
Ai xia ji (1955)
Liang Kuan yu Lin Shi Rong (1955) – Ng Dai Pang
Xu Huang Fei Hong zhuan (1955) – Iron-Pellet Lee
Chang sheng da (1955) – Cheng Nam San
Tian chang di jiu (1955)
Huang Fei Hong hua di qiang pao (1955) – Suen Kwan-Lun
Huang Fei Hong wen zhen si pai lou (1955) – Suen Kwan-Lun
Hou chuang (1955) – Fitness instructor
Huang Fei Hong chang ti jian ba (1955)
Huang Fei Hong da nao Fo Shan (1955) – Wu-So Yung
Huang Fei Hong huo shao Daoshatou (1956) – Drunk Cheong
Huang Fei Hong du bei dou wu long (1956) – Duk-Kok Lung
Fang Shi Yu yi jiu Hong Xi Guan (1956) – Lee Sam-yeh
Huang Fei Hong san xi nu biao shi (1956) – Pak Wing Fu
Huang Fei Hong yi jiu long mu miao (1956) – Bully Biu
Huang Fei Hong nu tun shi er shi (1956) – Pang Jan
Huang Fei Hong fu er hu (1956) – Yeung Fei-Fu
Huang Fei Hong xing shi hui qi lin (1956) – Sek Wang
Huang Fei Hong tie ji dou wu gong (1956) – Fung Lo-Ngau
Huang Fei Hong long zhou duo jin (1956) – Dai Mung Bing
Huang Fei Hong Shamian fu shen quan (1956) – Big Mole Mak
Huang Fei Hong heng sao Xiao Beijiang (1956) – Cheung Boon
Huang Fei-hong gong chuan jian ba (1956)
Bu xia xiang wei zhui hun biao (1956)
Huang Fei Hong yong jiu mai yu can (1956) – Bean Curd Hing
Huang Fei Hong Guanshan da he shou (1956) – Flying Spider
Bi xue en chou wan gu qing (1956)
Bai hao ying xiong chuan (1956)
Tie sha zhang san hui ying zhao wang (1956)
Huang Fei-hong tian hou miao jin xiang (1956) – Rocky Koo
Huang Fei Hong shui di san qin Su Shulian (1956) – Rat Tak
Huang Fei-hong qi shi hui jin long (1956)
Huang Fei Hong da nao hua deng (1956) – Kwok Hung Pau
Na Zha nao dong hai (1957) – East sea Dragon King
Huang Fei Hong Henan yu xie zhan (1957)
Nanhai quan wang ye dao mei hua ma (1957)
Huang Fei Hong shi wang zheng ba (1957)
Shui hu zhuan: Zhi qu sheng chen gang (1957) – 'Winged Tiger' Lui Wong
Huang Fei Hong die xie ma an shan (1957) – Lee Lung
Huang Fei Hong da po fei dao dang (1957) – Yuen Yiu Nam
Heng ba qi sheng sheng zi qi (1957)
Yan zhi ma san dou Huang Feihong (1957)
Huang Fei-hong ye tan hei long shan (1957) – Huen Muk
Huang Fei-hong xie jian su po wu (1957) – Crooked-Nose Biu
Jian qing (1958) – Old Master Lau
Huang Fei Hong wu du dou shuang long (1958) – Bearded Hung
Huang Fei Hong long zheng hu dou (1958)
Huang Fei Hong da po jin zhong zhao (1958)
Huang Fei Hong da nao Feng Huang Gang (1958) – Cheung Dai-Lung
Dai chat ho see gei (1958)
Huang Fei Hong lei tai dou wu hu (1958) – Mount Chuen Tiger
Huang Fei Hong fu qi chu san hai (1958)
Huang Fei Hong hu xue jiu Liang Kuan (1958) – Ma Yu Foo
Story of the Vulture Conqueror (1958–1959) – Wong Yeuk-see
Sword of Blood and Valour (1958–1959) – Wan Ming-san / Man Tsi-wah
Da po tong wang zhen (1959) – Tang Che
Qi xia wu yi ye tan chong xiao lou (1959) – Tang Che
Story of the White-Haired Demon Girl (1959, 3 parts)
Huang Fei Hong bei kun hei di yu (1959) – Ma Yu Fu
Shi xiong di (1959) – General
Huang Fei Hong hu peng fu hu (1959) – Yeung Fei Foo
Lu (1959)
Qi jian xia Tian Shan (1959)
Huang Fei Hong yi guan Cai hong qiao (1959) – Kam Si Kei
Huang Fei Hong lei tai zheng ba zhan (1960) – Yeung Fei Foo
Shi xiong di nu hai chu mo (1960)
Xing xing wang da zhan Huang Fei Hong (1960) – Wong Tak HIn
A Li Ba Ba yu si shi da dao (1960)
Zui hou wu fen zhong (1960)
Mi mi san nu tan (1960) – Lung Si Yeh
The Book and the Sword (1960)
The Story of the Great Heroes (1960–1961, 4 parts)
Huang Fei Hong yuan da po wu hu zhen (1961) – Flying Tiger Wong
Bu bu jing hun (1961) – Chow Chi-Hong
Tian shan long feng jian shang ji (1961)
Yuan yang dao shang ji (1961)
Yuan yang dao xia ji (1961)
Tian shan long feng jian xia ji (1961)
Mo quan zhui xiong (1961) – Kiu Yat Pu
Kun lun qi jian dou wu long (1961)
Kun Lun san nu xia (1961) – To Fu Kit
Ru yan jing hun (1962) – Sze Fu
Yu shi fei shi (1962) – Ma Yu Lung
Shuang jian meng (1962)
Shuang jian meng xia ji da jie ju (1962)
Mo ying jing hun (1962)
Huang mao guai ren (1962) – Cheung Yan Lai
Xian he shen zhen xin zhuan shang ji (1962)
Xi xue shen bian (1963)
The Black Centipede (1963)
Gu rou en chou (1963) – So Pak-Kin
Yi tian tu long ji shang ji (1963) – Golden Lion Tse Siu
Yi tian tu long ji xia ji (1963) – Golden Lion Tse Siu
Guai xia yan zi fei (1963) – Chow Cho-Kei
Nan long bei feng (1963) – Luk Fong-ho
Lei dian tian xian jian (1963) – Ma Lui
Hao men yuan (1963) – Hong Ngai-Chung
Story of the Sword and the Sabre (1963, 1965, 4 parts) – Xie Xun
Luoyang qi xia zhuan (1964) – Pui Tai-Pau
Bai gu li hun zhen shang ji (1964) – Lai Chun-Wah
Bai gu li hun zhen xia ji (1964) – Lai Chun-Wah
The Flying Fox (1964) – Yumyang Gwaisao
Hong jin long da zhan bian fu jing (1964)
Liu she dao (1964) – Chung Tin-bao
Xuehua shenjian (1964) – Shi Mau-Duen
Qing xia qing chou (1964)
Man tang ji qing (1964)
The Flying Fox in the Snowy Mountains (1964) – Yim Kei
Devil's Palm: Part 1 (1964)
Liu zhi qin mo (1965) – Lo Sing Hung
Gui gu shen nu (1965)
Dao jian shuang lan (1965)
Huang jiang san nu xia (1965)
The All-powerful Flute: Part 1 (1965)
Ru lai shen zhang nu sui Wan Jian Men (1965)
Te wu yi ling yi (1965)
Treasure Hunt (1965)
Tit gim jyu han seung jaap (1965)
Yat gim ching (1966) – Shek Dai-Hung
Bi luo hong chen shang ji (1966)
Wen jie men shang ji (1966)
Wen jie men xia ji (1966)
Sheng huo xiong feng shang ji (1966)
Sheng huo xiong feng xia ji (1966) – Hung Jan Tin
Jin ding you long (1966)
Zhen jia jin hu die (1966) – Chong Tak Ming
Jin ding you long gou hun ling (1966)
Jie huo hong lian shang ji (1966)
Yu nu jin gang (1967)
Bi yan mo nu (1967)
Yu mian nu sha xing (1967) – Wu Wan Lung
Kong zhong nu sha shou (1967)
Mao yan nu lang (1967)
Yu nu fei long (1967) – Wong Chong
Story of a Discharged Prisoner (1967) – One-eyed Dragon
Hak ye mau ba hoi yeung wai (1967)
Qi jian shi san xia (1967) – Iron Head Snake / Zen Master Fearless
Hong fen jin gang (1967)
Fei zei jin si mao (1967)
Huang Fei Hong hu zhao hui qan ying (1967) – Mang Fu
Sha shou fen hong zuan (1967)
Tian jian jue dao Shang ji (1967) – Tso Kam-pak
Wu di nu sha shou (1967)
Hei sha xing (1967)
Li hou zhu (1968)
Huang Fei Hong wei zhen wu yang cheng (1968)
Du yan xia (1968)
Ru lai shen zhang zai xian shen wei (1968)
Huang Fei Hong xing shi du ba mei hua zhuang (1968) – Cheung Hing-Fui
Xue ying hong deng (1968)
Lan ying (1968) – Lam Kei
Fang Shi Yu san da mu ren xiang (1968)
Tai ji men (1968) – Kuan
Huang Fei Hong zui da ba jin gang (1968) – Iron Palm
Duo ming dao (1968)
Fei xia xiao bai long (1968)
Shen bian xia (1968)
Sha shou jian (1968) – Gor Kong Lung
Huang Fei Hong rou bo hei ba wang (1968) – Pak Foo
Xiao wu yi da po tong wang zhen (1968) – Chief Guard Fang Lui-ying
Huang Fei Hong: Quan wang zheng ba (1968) – Tai Tin Pau
Xia sheng (1968)
Tie er hu (1968) – To Chan-ping
Tian lang zhai (1968) – Scarface Wolf
Duo ming ci xiong jian (1969)
Huang Fei Hong qiao duo sha yu qing (1969)
Fei zei bai ju hua (1969)
Shen tou zi mei hua (1969) – Ho Pau
Huang Fei Hong shen wei fu san sha (1969) – Ko San Fu
Long dan (1969)
Yin dao xue jian (1969)
Du yan xia du chuang jian hu (1969)
Sam chiu liu (1969)
E Mei ba dao (1969)
Jiang hu di yi jian (1969)
Huang Fei Hong yu xie liu huang gu (1969) – Bat Leung
Tong pi tie gu (1969) – Shek Tin-Geng
Yu mian sha xing (1969)
Du bei shen ni (1969)
Huang shan ke (1969)
Yu nu jian (1969)
Xiao wu shi (1969)
Huang Fei Hong hu de dou wu lang (1969) – Ma Tin Lung / Fei Tin Leung
San sha shou (1970)
Nu jian kuang dao (1970) – Chang Si Fang
Shen tan yi hao (1970)
Huang Fei Hong yong po lie huo zhen (1970)
Cai Li Fo yong qin se mo (1970)
Shi wang zhi wang (1971)
Ri yue shen tong (1971)
Fei xia shen dao (1971)
The Comet Strikes (1971)
Jin xuan feng (1972)
Ji xiang du fang (1972) – Li-shan Ho
Shi hou (1972)
Wang ming tu (1972) – Master Xi – village leader
Tian ya ke (1972)
Enter the Dragon (1973) – Han
Fan mai ren kou (1974)
Er long zheng zhu (1974) – Tiger
Lang bei wei jian (1974)
Two Graves to Kung Fu (1974)
Huang Fei Hong yi qu Ding Cai Pao (1974) – Master Shen Chiu Kung
Hou quan kou si (1974) – Chow Li Ming – Charles Ming
Yinyang jie (1974)
Long jia jiang (1976) – Patriarch Lung
Hua xin san shao sao Yin Jie (1976)
Hua sheng san shao bo yin jie (1976)
The Private Eyes (1976) – Gow-suk – Uncle 9
Xia liu she hui (1976) – Boss Shih
Yin xia en chou lu (1978) – Lo Tien-fung
Xing gui (1979)
Long xing mo qiao (1980) – Master
The Young Master (1980) – Chief Sang Kung
She mao he hun xing quan (1980)
Bruce King of Kung Fu (1980)
Ru lai shen zhang (1982) – Heavenly Foot
Hua xin da shao (1983) – Mo Yan-sang
Gan yan gwai (1984) – Jian Ren – Uncle Ghost
Hong Kong 1941 (1984) – Chung Shin
Dian feng kuang long (1984)
Hong Kong Godfather (1985) – Szetu Han
Aces Go Places 4 (1986) – Interpol Hockey Teach Coach
Millionaire's Express (1986) – Master Sek
E nan (1986) – Man in Picture
The Magic Crystal (1986) – Sergeant Shi
Mao shan xiao tang (1986) – Kent of Mount Mao
Wo yao jin gui xu (1986)
Duet ming ga yan (1987) – Fung's Father
Nan bei ma da (1988) – Mr. Guan
A Better Tomorrow 3 (1989) – Mun's father
Hu dan nu er hong (1990) – Liu Lung
Wu ye tian shi (1990) – Grandpa
Huang Fei Hong xiao zhuan (1992) – Old Master
Jian ren shi jia (1994) – Kan San
Xiang Gang lun xian (1994) – Himself
Sap hing dai (1995) – Uncle Three (final film role)

TV series
The Legend of the Book and the Sword (1976) – Cheung Chiu-chung
The Heaven Sword and Dragon Saber (1978) – Tse Seun
Chor Lau-heung (1979) – Lung Sing-saam
Demi-Gods and Semi-Devils (1982) – Xiao Yuanshan
The Legend of the Condor Heroes (1983) – Kao Chin-yan
The Return of the Condor Heroes (1983) – Kao Chin-yan
The Other Side of the Horizon (1984) – Fu Chin-san
The Smiling, Proud Wanderer (1984) – Wong Yuen-ba
Sword Stained with Royal Blood (1985) – Muk Yan-ching
The Flying Fox of Snowy Mountain (1985) – Seung Kim-ming
Man from Guangdong (1991)

References

External links

Sek Kin at hkmdb.com
Shih Kien at lovehkfilm.com
hkcinemagic entry
Obituary by the Associated Press

1913 births
2009 deaths
Chinese Christians
Deaths from kidney disease
Disease-related deaths in Hong Kong
Hong Kong male film actors
People from Panyu District
Hong Kong male television actors
Hong Kong martial artists
Hong Kong wushu practitioners
Converts to Christianity
Male actors from Guangzhou
Sportspeople from Guangzhou
Chinese male film actors
Chinese male television actors
Chinese wushu practitioners
20th-century Chinese male actors
20th-century Hong Kong male actors